Barra Sugianto (born March 19, 1992), is an Indonesian professional basketball player.  He plays for the Bimasakti Nikko Steel Malang club of the Indonesian Basketball League.

He represented Indonesia's national basketball team at the 2016 SEABA Cup, where he was his team's best free throw shooter.

Bimasakti Malang
He signed with Bimasakti Malang club to form the "big three" along with Yanuar Dwi Priasmoro and Bima Riski. During the 2014-2015 Regular NBL Season, he scored a career high 24 points and grabbed 10 rebounds to help Bimasakti win against Stadium Jakarta. In the next two games, he scored 18 and 16 against Garuda Bandung and Satria Muda Pertamina Jakarta respectively, but couldn't get the wins.

References

External links
 Indonesian Basketball League profile
 NBL Indonesia profile
 Asia-basket.com profile

1992 births
Living people
Indonesian men's basketball players
Power forwards (basketball)
People from Tangerang
Sportspeople from Banten